Jamshed Iqbal Cheema (born 2 March 1965) is a Pakistani politician who served in the Imran Khan cabinet as the Special Assistant to the Prime Minister on Food Security since 19 April 2021 till 10 April 2022.

Early life 
Cheema was born on 2 March 1965 in Lahore, Pakistan.

Political career 
On 19 April 2021, he was appointed as Special Assistant to the Prime Minister on Food Security by Imran Khan.

On 25 May 2022, he was arrested by the police in order to stop the party from holding long march in Islamabad.

On 17 July 2022, he was arrested from Lahore for blaming him for his involvement in injuring a PML-N activist at a polling station in PP-158 as by-polls on 20 constituencies are underway in the Punjab province.

References

External links 
Jamshed Iqbal Cheema on Twitter

1965 births
Living people
Pakistani politicians
Pakistan Tehreek-e-Insaf politicians
Politicians from Lahore
Imran Khan administration